Mir Khalid Humayun Langau is a Pakistani politician who was a Member of the Provincial Assembly of Balochistan, from May 2013 to May 2018.

Early life and education
He was born on 7 May 1978 in Kalat District.

He has a degree in Master of Arts.

Political career
He was elected to the Provincial Assembly of Balochistan as a candidate of National Party from Constituency PB-36 Kalat-I in 2013 Pakistani general election.

References

Living people
Balochistan MPAs 2013–2018
1978 births